Newberry High School may refer to:

Newberry High School (Florida), Newberry, Florida
Newberry High School (Michigan), Newberry, Michigan
Newberry High School (South Carolina), Newberry, South Carolina
Newberry Academy, Newberry, South Carolina